The 2023 Thailand Open was a professional WTA tournament played on outdoor hard courts. It was the 3rd edition of the Thailand Open as part of the WTA 250 tournaments of the 2023 WTA Tour. It took place at the True Arena Hua Hin in Hua Hin, Thailand, from 30 January to 5 February 2023.

Champions

Singles

  Zhu Lin def.  Lesia Tsurenko 6–4, 6–4

Doubles

  Chan Hao-ching /  Wu Fang-hsien vs  Wang Xinyu /  Zhu Lin, 6–1, 7–6(8–6)

Points and prize money

Point distribution

Prize money

Singles main draw entrants

Seeds

1 Rankings as of January 16, 2023.

Other entrants
The following players received wildcards into the singles main draw:
  Bianca Andreescu
  Bethanie Mattek-Sands
  Lanlana Tararudee

The following players received entry from the qualifying draw:
  Alexandra Eala
  Liang En-shuo
  Ekaterina Makarova
  Valeria Savinykh
  Astra Sharma
  Joanne Züger

Withdrawals
Before the tournament
  Marie Bouzková → replaced by  Katie Boulter
  Léolia Jeanjean → replaced by  Anastasia Zakharova
  Kristína Kučová → replaced by  Lesia Tsurenko
  Magda Linette → replaced by  Mirjam Björklund
  Claire Liu → replaced by  Heather Watson
  Ajla Tomljanović → replaced by  Nao Hibino

Retirements
  Bianca Andreescu (illness)

Doubles main draw entrants

Seeds

1 Rankings as of January 16, 2023

Other entrants 
The following pairs received wildcards into the doubles main draw:
  Han Xinyun /  Bethanie Mattek-Sands
  Luksika Kumkhum /  Peangtarn Plipuech

The following pair received entry as alternates:
  Natalija Stevanović /  Anastasia Tikhonova

Withdrawals 
 Before the tournament
  Han Xinyun /  Moyuka Uchijima → replaced by  Wang Xinyu /  Zhu Lin
  Marta Kostyuk  /  Elena-Gabriela Ruse → replaced by  Natalija Stevanović /  Anastasia Tikhonova
 During the tournament
  Linda Fruhvirtová /  Anna Kalinskaya (sickness)

References

External links
Official website
WTA profile

2023 WTA Tour
2023 in women's tennis
Tennis, WTA Tour, Thailand Open
Tennis, WTA Tour,
Thailand Open
2023
Tennis WTA Tour, Thailand open
Tennis,
WTA Tour, Thailand Open